The 1980 SWAC men's basketball tournament was held February 28–March 2, 1980. The quarterfinal round was held at the home arena of the higher-seeded team, while the semifinal and championship rounds were held at the Mississippi Coliseum in Jackson, Mississippi. Alcorn State defeated , 83–61 in the championship game. The Braves received the conference's automatic bid to the 1980 NCAA tournament as No. 8 seed in the Midwest Region.

Bracket and results

References

1979–80 Southwestern Athletic Conference men's basketball season
SWAC men's basketball tournament